Game Chef is an annual American contest for role-playing game designers.

History
Jason Morningstar submitted The Shab-al-Hiri Roach to the Game Chef 2005 competition, where it was chosen as one of the "Inner Circle" - the group of the nine best games from that year's 28 entrants.

Morningstar also wrote Durance for the Game Chef 2011 competition.

References

Game awards